Karol Kmeťko (December 12, 1875 – December 22, 1948) was the Roman Catholic Bishop of Nitra in Slovakia (1920-1948) and personal archbishop (from 1944).

Early life and ordination
Born in Veľké Držkovce, in the Trencsén County of the Kingdom of Hungary (present-day Slovakia), his interest in Catholicism led him to the priesthood. At the age of 23, Kmetko was ordained a priest in Nitra on July 2, 1899. Twenty-one years later, on February 13, 1921, he was appointed Bishop of Nitra.

Bishop
Before the 1942 deportations of Jews from Slovakia,  Kmeťko confronted the president of the Slovak State, Jozef Tiso, with reliable reports of the murder of Jews in the Ukraine. Kmeťko asked: "How  can  the  government  allow  [the  deportations],  when  it  is said that they carry the [Jews] off to their death?"  According to Kmeťko, Tiso replied "with something that I [Kmeťko] could not fully accept: ‘It’s enough for me that I have assurances from the Germans that they treat [the Jews] humanely, that they are used there as workers. For if Slovaks can go to Germany to work, why can’t the [Jews] do the same?’"

On May 11, 1944, Kmeťko was appointed Archbishop of Nitra in Slovakia. According to the Catholic Hierarchy, Kmetko was a priest for 49.5 years and a bishop for 27.9 years. He died in December 1948 at the age of seventy-three.

References

1875 births
1948 deaths
People from Bánovce nad Bebravou District
People from the Kingdom of Hungary
Roman Catholic archbishops in Czechoslovakia
Slovak People's Party politicians
Members of the Revolutionary National Assembly of Czechoslovakia
Members of the Chamber of Deputies of Czechoslovakia (1920–1925)
Bishops of Nitra